Ilya Dervuk (Илья Дервук ; born July 9, 1996) is a Russian professional ice hockey defenceman. He is currently playing with Amur Khabarovsk of the Kontinental Hockey League (KHL).

Playing career
Dervuk made his Kontinental Hockey League (KHL) debut playing with Avangard Omsk during the 2013–14 KHL season.

After five seasons in the KHL, Dervuk starting the 2018–19 with HC Yugra in the Supreme Hockey League (VHL), opted to move abroad in signing a try-out contract with Czech outfit, HC Dynamo Pardubice of the Czech Extraliga (ELH), on October 23, 2018.

References

External links

1996 births
Living people
Avangard Omsk players
HC Dynamo Pardubice players
Omskie Yastreby players
Russian ice hockey defencemen
HC Yugra players
Sportspeople from Omsk
Russian expatriate sportspeople in the Czech Republic
Russian expatriate ice hockey people
Expatriate ice hockey players in the Czech Republic
Russian expatriate sportspeople in Kazakhstan
Expatriate ice hockey players in Kazakhstan
Saryarka Karagandy players
Sokol Krasnoyarsk players
Zvezda Moscow players
HC Khimik Voskresensk players